The Butler Grizzlies are the sports teams of Butler Community College located in El Dorado, Kansas, United States. They participate in the National Junior College Athletic Association (NJCAA) and in the Kansas Jayhawk Community College Conference.

Sports

Men's sports
Baseball
Basketball
Cross country
Football
Track & field

Women's sports
Basketball
Cross country
Soccer
Softball
Track & field
Volleyball

Facilities
Butler Community College has five athletics facilities.
 BG Products Veterans Sports Complex – home of the Grizzlies football team
 Butler Soccer Field – home of the Lady Grizzlies soccer team
 East Park Softball – home of the Grizzlies softball team
 McDonald Baseball Stadium – home of the Grizzlies baseball team
 Power Plant Gymnasium – home of the Grizzlies men's and women's basketball, and volleyball teams

Records

Butler Softball has currently won 88 consecutive games, dating back to March 3, 2016, when the Grizzlies beat Barton Community College 9–1. This includes the 2016 NJCAA Div. I National Championship.

Butler Football is tied for the most national championships by any junior college football program. Troy Morrell won three of those national titles (2003, 2007, 2008) before resigning with a 154–22 record in 2014. Morrell has since been inducted into both the NJCAA Hall of Fame and Kansas Sports Hall of Fame.

National Championships

 Football: 6 (1981, 1998, 1999, 2003, 2007, 2008)
 Basketball: 1 (1953)
 Softball: 1 (2016)
 Men's cross country: 2 (1970, 1995)
 Women's cross country: 1 (2002)

Notable Grizzlies

 Tony Allen, NBA guard
 William Bartee, NFL defensive back
 Heath Bell, MLB pitcher
 Roger Bernhardt, NFL offensive guard
 Willie Blade, NFL defensive tackle
 Chris Carson, NFL running back
 Branden Dozier, CFL defensive and special teams player 
 Ron Fellows, NFL cornerback
 Michael Gallup, NFL wide receiver
 Ted Gilmore, College Football and NFL Assistant Coach
 Robert Goff, NFL defensive lineman
 Jamie Holland, NFL wide receiver
 Willie Hordge, sprinter
 David Irons, NFL cornerback
 Bruce Irvin, NFL player
 Stephen Jackson, NBA basketball player
 Rudi Johnson, NFL running back
 Kwamie Lassiter, NFL cornerback
 DeMarcus Lawrence, NFL defensive end
 Betty Lennox, WNBA guard
 Elbert Mack, NFL defensive back
 Zach Mettenberger, NFL quarterback
 Kasib Powell, NBA  forward
Byron Pringle, NFL wide receiver
 Jerry Quick, NFL offensive lineman
 Damarious Randall, NFL cornerback
 Butch Reynolds, Olympian track and field athlete
 Nate Robertson, MLB pitcher
 James Robinson, NFL wide receiver
 Shaun Smith, NFL defensive lineman
 Press Taylor, NFL assistant coach
 Zac Taylor, NFL Head Coach and NFL/CFL quarterback
 Fred Torneden, long-distance runner and fastest American marathon runner in 1984
 Dave Thomas, NFL cornerback
 Mao Tosi, NFL defensive tackle (played only basketball at Butler)
 Seth Wheeler, former player and current Emporia State University coach
 Markus White, NFL linebacker
 Jonathan Wilhite, NFL cornerback
 Ivory Williams, sprinter
 Jermaine Williams, former NFL running back

References

External links
 

Sports teams in Kansas
Butler Community College